Mick Egan (born 18 February 1958) is  a former Australian rules footballer who played with Footscray in the Victorian Football League (VFL).

Notes 

Mick Egan won the Australians Biggest Galoot Competition in 2016 against contestants Daryl Riley (Jamieson Victoria) and Ian Jones (Essendon Victoria) as the runners up on the nationwide event.

Mick Egan also defeated Wayne ‘Spud’ Campbell in a golf tournament at the famous St Andrews golf club, Scotland, in May 2016.

He is a father of 3 and has a splendid family

External links 

Living people
1958 births
Australian rules footballers from Victoria (Australia)
Western Bulldogs players